Elections to Runnymede Council were held on 7 May 1998.  One third of the council was up for election and the Conservative party gained overall control of the council from no overall control.

After the election, the composition of the council was
Conservative 23
Labour 12
Independent 5
Liberal Democrat 1
Residents Association 1

Election result

Ward results

References
"Council poll results", The Guardian 9 May 1998 page 16
Ward results

1998
1998 English local elections
1990s in Surrey